Schwerinsburg (Schwerin's castle) is the biggest of three castles in Windhoek, Namibia. Today it is the private residence of the Italian ambassador in Namibia.

History

During the time of the construction of Alte Feste in 1890 the tower of Schwerinsburg was built by Curt von François, commissioner of German South-West Africa. In 1904 Schutztruppe (the German colonial forces) sold it to architect Wilhelm Sander who converted it into a beer garden and named it Sperlingslust (lit. "Sparrows' delight").

In 1913 Hans Bogislav Graf von Schwerin, governor of the Gobabis District of German South-West Africa, bought Sperlingslust from Sander and engaged him to convert it into a castle. It was later named Schwerinsburg after the new owner.

See also 
 Heinitzburg
 Sanderburg

References 

Buildings and structures in Windhoek
Castles in Namibia